Intoxicated Love (German: Liebe im Rausch) is a 1927 German silent film directed by Georg Jacoby and starring Elga Brink, Stewart Rome and Georg Alexander. It was shot at the EFA Studios in Berlin. The film's art direction was by Franz Schroedter and Hermann Warm.

Cast
Elga Brink as Elga Lee  
Stewart Rome as Jack Kent  
Georg Alexander as Richard Courday  
Marietta Millner as Harriet Milton  
Jack Trevor as Robert Elliot 
Karl Meinhardt as Fu-Chow 
Nien Soen Ling as Sein Diener 
Frida Richard as Wirtschafterin

References

External links

Films of the Weimar Republic
German silent feature films
Films directed by Georg Jacoby
German black-and-white films
Films set in China
Films set in Japan
Films shot at Halensee Studios
1920s German films